The Kinburn Peninsula is a peninsula in Southern Ukraine, which separates the Dnieper–Bug estuary from the Black Sea. Administratively the peninsula is divided between two regions, each represented by one rural community: Pokrovske (Mykolaiv Oblast) and Heroiske (Kherson Oblast), population  1,450. It is part of the Ivory Coast of Sviatoslav National Nature Park.

Etymology
Etymology comes from Turkish Kılburun, literally 'nose (land strip) [as subtle as a] hair'.

Geography 
The western tip of the peninsula extends into the Kinburn Spit.

To the south is a pair of islands, Dovhyi and Kruhlyi - both belong administratively to the Mykolaiv Raion of Mykolaiv Oblast.

The peninsula includes the villages of Pokrovka, Pokrovske and Vasylivka, in Mykolaiv Oblast, and Heroiske, in the Kherson Oblast.

History 
The Battle of Kinburn was fought on 17 October 1855 as part of the Crimean War.

2022 Russian invasion

References 

Geography of Kherson Oblast
Peninsulas of Ukraine
Geography of Mykolaiv Oblast